The EMU900 series is a series of electric multiple unit passenger trains owned by Taiwan Railways Administration (TRA). Manufactured in South Korea by Hyundai Rotem, the trains are used on Local and Fast Local services, which stop at most stations. They entered service on 6 April 2021.

History 
The EMU900 series were purchased by the TRA as part of an effort to replace its aging rolling stock, specifically the Chu-Kuang and Fu-Hsing services, and to increase the carrying capacity of the system. In 2017, the Ministry of Transportation and Communications approved an approximately $100 billion NTD plan to replace 990 rail vehicles, or 39.15% of all vehicles, by 2024. The plan included 520 electric commuter railcars, 600 intercity railcars (EMU3000 series), 107 diesel locomotives, and 60 electro-diesel railcars. As the only bidder, South Korea's Hyundai Rotem was contracted for building the commuter railcars for $25.7 billion NTD. This marks the first contract given to Hyundai Rotem since 1999.

The trains were built in Hyundai Rotem's Changwon plant. The first two trainsets were delivered to the Port of Hualien on 24 October 2020, and began special passenger services between Shulin and Keelung from 1 April 2021, between Shulin and Hualien on 5–6 April as an additional service during the Qingming Festival, and eventually on 6 April as an ordinary local train between Keelung and Miaoli. Hyundai Rotem plans on delivering all trainsets by 2023.

On 1 June 2021, EMU901 was temporarily withdrawn from service due to abnormal signaling within its power system. In November 2021 the EMU900 series attracted controversy due to water leakage from the air conditioning units, which is a very common problem in this set up with roof mounted AC units. Investigations revealed that the air conditioning units were supplied by a German firm with factories in China, acting as subcontractor to the car builder, which was technically against contract terms as China is not a signatory to the WTO GPA (Government Procurement Agreement).

Design 
The exterior of the train is designed by MBD Technologies, a French company involved with the design of the TGV. The design is based around the concept of "a smiling welcome". Each train is composed of ten cars, which is longer than its predecessors. According to the TRA, the EMU900 series is equipped with train control and management system (TCMS), which provide centralized controls for the doors, air conditioning, and fire safety equipment aboard the train. Additionally, the train's lighting can adjust automatically based on the exterior brightness to conserve electricity. The train's interior features twelve bicycle racks, priority seats for pregnant women, eight wheelchair spaces, and three restrooms.

Formations 

Key:

 VVVF: Motor
 Rc: Rectifier
 Mtr: Transformer
 VCB: Vacuum circuit breaker
 SIV: Static inverter
 CP: Air compressor (main pump)
 ACP: Auxiliary air compressor (assisted pump)
 : Control cab (1st and 10th cars), crew room (5th car)
 : Toilet
 : Disabled facilities (wheelchair space and disabled toilet)
 : Bike rack

Exterior

References 

Electric multiple units of Taiwan
Hyundai Rotem multiple units
25 kV AC multiple units